Matthew Peart (born June 11, 1997) is a Jamaican-born American football offensive tackle for the New York Giants of the National Football League (NFL). He played college football at UConn.

Early life and high school
Peart was born in Kingston, Jamaica and his family immigrated to the United States when he was four years old, settling in The Bronx, New York. Peart played basketball and participated in the Oliver Scholars Program, which prepares students from underserved communities for top independent schools. Peart earned a scholarship to attend The Governor's Academy in Byfield, Massachusetts. Despite never having played the sport before, Peart became an offensive and defensive lineman for the school's football team and helped the Governors to four straight Independent School League championships. Rated a two-star recruit, Peart committed to play college football at the University of Connecticut.

College career
Peart redshirted his true freshman season at UConn. He was named the Huskies' starting left tackle during spring practice after redshirting started all 12 of the team's games at that position during his redshirt freshman and sophomore seasons before moving to right tackle before his redshirt junior season. Peart again started all 12 of UConn's games as during his redshirt junior season. In his final season, Peart was named first-team All-American Athletic Conference. Peart started all 48 games during his four seasons of eligibility.

Professional career

New York Giants

2020
Peart was selected by the New York Giants in the third round with the 99th overall pick in the 2020 NFL Draft.

Peart made his NFL debut on September 27, 2020, in a 9–36 loss to the San Francisco 49ers. Peart made his first career start during Week 6, taking the place of Andrew Thomas after Thomas arrived late for a team meeting and was subsequently benched. Peart was placed on the reserve/COVID-19 list by the team on November 20, 2020, and activated on December 1.

2021
Peart got his first start of the season at right tackle against the Dallas Cowboys with Andrew Thomas hurt and Nate Solder moving to left tackle. In Week 16 against the Philadelphia Eagles Peart suffered a torn ACL and was placed on injured reserve on December 27. He finished the season playing in 15 games with five starts at right tackle.

2022
On August 23, 2022, Peart was placed on the reserve/PUP list to start the season. On November 12, 2022, Peart was activated from the reserve list.

References

External links 
New York Giants bio
UConn Huskies bio

1997 births
Living people
Jamaican players of American football
Jamaican emigrants to the United States
Sportspeople from Kingston, Jamaica
Sportspeople from the Bronx
Players of American football from New York City
American football offensive tackles
UConn Huskies football players
New York Giants players
The Governor's Academy alumni